Vibrio pelagius is a gram negative, oxidase and catalase positive marine bacterium described in 1971.
It is commonly found in marine environments and has been isolated from marine sponges of the Saint Martin's Island area of the Bay of Bengal, Bangladesh. Colonies are round and whitish, of medium size; individual bacteria have a curved rod shape and are motile.

References 

Vibrionales
Bacteria described in 2021